Shigeyoshi Inoue (1889-1975), WWII Japanese admiral
Yoshika Inoue  (1845-1929), Russo-Japanese War admiral